A Boat Load of Home Folk (1968) is a novel by Australian author Thea Astley.

Plot summary 

The novel follows a group of passengers on a cruise ship docked at a Pacific Island as a hurricane approaches.

Critical reception

In The Canberra Times Liam Mason noted that the reader was able to sympathise with the novel's characters: "There is also an almost depressing realism in Miss Astley's resolutions of her characters' crises: the failure of a friend, the failure of a marriage, the failure of a priest, the failure (at the most trivial level) of a womaniser in a would-be seduction. For there is not necessarily any solution. Nor need there be a new start after the ritual of death and disaster."

Michael Wilding, writing in Southerly found a lot to like about the book, but also had some reservations: "The precision of the writing, the spareness and clarity, are immediately appealing. But as the novel progresses the lack of any substantial content lets the writing drift towards the somewhat consciously fine, and the religious references—the recurrent calvaries, crucifixions and expiations, become obtrusive."

See also
 1968 in literature

References

Novels by Thea Astley
1968 Australian novels
Angus & Robertson books